The 1971 Asian Champion Club Tournament was the fourth edition of the annual Asian club football competition hosted by Asian Football Confederation. Eight clubs from eight countries competed in the tournament, with Jardine Hong Kong withdrawing before the draw. The tournament was held in Bangkok, Thailand from 21 March to 2 April; it was originally scheduled to be held in Kuwait, but the AFC moved the tournament as Kuwaiti immigration laws would have seen the delegation of Israeli club Maccabi Tel Aviv refused entry into the country.

The eight clubs were split in two groups of four and the group winners and the runners-up advanced to semifinals. 

The final was scratched and Maccabi Tel Aviv were awarded their second Asian title after Aliyat Al-Shorta (IRQ) refused to play them for political reasons. During the award ceremony, Aliyat Al-Shorta players waved the Palestinian flag around the field.

Participants

Result

Preliminary round
These were the group allocation matches: each group consisted of two winners and two losers from this round. Following the original draw, Aliyat Al-Shorta refused to play their scheduled opponent Maccabi Tel Aviv: subsequently, a second draw was conducted.

Group stage

Group A

Group B

 1: Aliyat Al-Shorta refused to play for political reasons: the match was awarded to Maccabi 3–0.

Knockout stage

Semi-finals

Third-place match

Final

1 Aliyat Al-Shorta refused to play for political reasons; therefore, the final was scratched and Maccabi Tel Aviv were awarded the championship.

Exhibition match

This match was arranged by the AFC and the Thai FA, and was played in lieu of the final.

References

External links
Asian Club Competitions 1971 at RSSSF.com

1
1971
1971
Asian Champion Club Tournament, 1971